Muntadher Mohammed Jebur Naslookhi (born 5 June 2001) is an Iraqi professional footballer who plays as a left-back for UAE First Division League club Al-Taawon and the Iraq national team.

Club career
Mohammed was on the bench for Al-Zawraa's AFC Champions League match on 7 April 2021, against Al-Wahda in Abu Dhabi. On 19 July 2021, Muntadher started the Iraq FA Cup final in the Iraqi El Clasico against rivals Al-Quwa Al-Jawiya, playing the full ninety as his side lost on penalties. Two months later, he came on as Al-Zawraa beat Al-Jawiya to take the 2021 Iraqi Super Cup, his first title at club and senior level.

International career
Mohammed has represented Iraq at every single age category, winning three titles and captaining his country from U-18 onwards, and has competed at the AFC Asian Championship and FIFA World Cup at youth level.

Iraq U-14
Muntadher received his first international call-up in 2014, when he travelled to Iran with Iraq's U-14s and won the AFC U-14 Championship, topping their group ahead of South Korea and beating North Korea in the final.

Iraq U-17
In 2015, Mohammed was invited to join Iraq's U-16s in their qualifiers for the 2016 AFC U-16 Championship. He helped Iraq win their group and qualify for the final tournament, where he was called up. He helped Iraq win the tournament, scoring twice and qualifying for the 2017 FIFA U-17 World Cup.

In October 2017, Muntadher was called up to the Iraq U-17 squad for the 2017 FIFA U-17 World Cup. He played in all four of Iraq's matches as they made it to the Round of 16.

Iraq U-20
In August 2019, Muntadher captained his country for the first time, leading Iraq's U-18s to the 2019 WAFF U-18 Championship title, his third international trophy.

In November 2017, Mohammed was called up to the Iraq U-19 squad for the 2018 AFC U-19 Championship qualifiers, where Iraq finished second in their group and qualified.

In the following qualifiers, he captained Iraq's U-19s and scored in their final match as they won their group undefeated and qualified for the 2020 AFC U-19 Championship. In January 2021, after several delays, the AFC cancelled the tournament due to the COVID-19 pandemic.

In February 2020, Mohammed captained Iraq's U-20s in the U-20 Arab Cup as they made it to the quarter-finals.

Iraq U-23
Muntadher was the captain of the Iraq U-23s that won their qualifying group and qualified to the 2022 AFC U-23 Asian Cup in October 2021. He scored in Iraq's final qualifier against Bahrain.

Iraq
Following his impressive stint captaining the U-23s, Muntadher received his first senior international call-up for Iraq's World Cup qualifiers against Syria and South Korea, remaining an unused sub in both matches.

He was then included in Iraq's 2021 FIFA Arab Cup squad, making his debut off the bench in their opening match against Oman.

Personal life
Muntadher's older brother Mustafa Mohammed is also a footballer and was his teammate at Al-Zawraa between 2019 and 2021.

Honours
Iraq U-14
AFC U-14 Championship: 2014

Iraq U-16
AFC U-16 Championship: 2016

Iraq U-18
WAFF U-18 Championship: 2019

Al-Zawraa
Iraq FA Cup: 2020-21 (runners-up)
Iraqi Super Cup: 2021

References

2001 births
Living people
Iraqi footballers
Association football fullbacks
Iraq international footballers
Iraq youth international footballers